John Hanson is an American movie director and cinematographer.

Early life 
Born in St. Paul, Minnesota in 1942 and raised in McClusky, North Dakota, Hanson graduated from Phillips Exeter Academy, received his B.A. from Carleton College, and did postgraduate studies in architecture at the Harvard Graduate School of Design.

Career 
He began his career in film, going on to direct the motion pictures Northern Lights, Wildrose, and Shimmer, and numerous film, video and television documentaries. His films have been shown at film festivals around the world, including Venice, Berlin, London, Toronto, New York, Chicago, Sundance and Cannes, where Northern Lights won the Caméra d'Or award at the Cannes Film Festival for Best First Feature of 1979. In addition to many other film awards, he received the Distinguished Achievement Award from Carleton College and an Honorary Doctorate of Humane Letters from Northland College. He is past chair and current board member of the Wisconsin Humanities Council. He was a founding member of Cine Manifest, a seminal independent film collective in San Francisco and the Independent Feature Project. He lives in Bayfield, Wisconsin.

Works

Books 
Below the Sky: Photographs of the High Plains
The High Plains—the Dakotas, Montana, southern Saskatchewan—lie under a vast sky. Weather and wind throw cloud shadows across the landscape, a moving panorama of light, color and form. Earth meets sky at an incredibly distant horizon. Transcendent images materialize, drift away, reappear as the light shifts through the heavens. These remarkable photographs, taken over a span of 30 years, capture the magical moods and textures of a sublime, singular landscape—a rare retrospective of images taken by Hanson as he rambled the back roads of the plains below the sky. With an introduction by Minnesota writer Patricia Hampl and a foreword by Hanson.

Film

Appearances 

 Michael Feldman's Whad'Ya Know?, July 9, 2011

References

External links

American film directors
American cinematographers
American documentary filmmakers
Carleton College alumni
Harvard Graduate School of Design alumni
Year of birth missing (living people)
Living people
Directors of Caméra d'Or winners